Andreas Okopenko  (15 March 1930, Košice – 27 June 2010, Vienna) was an Austrian writer.

Andreas Okopenko's father was a Ukrainian physician and his mother was Austrian. From 1939, the family lived in Vienna. After studying chemistry at the University of Vienna Okopenko was active in the industry. Starting from 1950 he dedicated himself increasingly to the literature. From 1951 to 1953, he created a literature magazine, in which he published works by numerous members of the Austrian avant-garde of that time. From 1968 until his death he lived as a freelance writer in Vienna.

Okopenko was, from 1973 to 1985, a member of the Grazer author meeting  and from 1999 until his death he was a member of the Austrian art senate.

Honors
1965 Anton Wildgans price
1977 Austrian appreciation price for literature
1983 Literary award of the city Vienna
1993 Literary award of the Hertha Kräftner society (Grosshöflein/Burgenland)
1995 Golden honour medal of the city Vienna
1998 Grand Austrian State Prize
2002 George Trakl price

Notable works
  Child Nazi , 1984
  Affenzucker/Neue Lockergedichte , 1999

External links
 
Literaturlandschaft Österreich: Andreas Okopenko
Überblick über Texte von Andreas Okopenko im Internet
ELEX - Der elektronische Lexikon-Roman
Obituary, in Die Presse

1930 births
2010 deaths
Austrian male writers
Austrian people of Ukrainian descent
Anton Wildgans Prize winners
Theodor Körner Prize recipients